Sir William Lowther, 3rd Baronet (1727 – 15 April 1756) was an English landowner, of Marske Hall, Yorkshire and Holker Hall. He was the eldest son of Sir Thomas Lowther, 2nd Baronet and Lady Elizabeth Cavendish.

In January 1755, he inherited the Whitehaven estates and coal mines from his fourth cousin once removed, Sir James Lowther, 4th Baronet, and succeeded him as Member of Parliament for Cumberland. However, he died unmarried in 1756, last of his line. He left the bulk of his estates, including the Whitehaven inheritance, to his fourth cousin, James Lowther. Holker Hall, which had come from his grandmother Catherine Preston, was left to a distant cousin of his mother Lady Elizabeth Cavendish, Lord George Cavendish.

Marske Hall was bought by Thomas Dundas, later Lord Dundas, in 1762.

References

Lowther pedigree 1

|-

Baronets in the Baronetage of England
Lord-Lieutenants of Westmorland
Members of the Parliament of Great Britain for English constituencies
1727 births
1756 deaths
English landowners
William
British MPs 1754–1761